Ernest Frederic Bezzant (26 October 1916 – 1 October 2002) was a New Zealand cricketer who played four first-class matches in New Zealand in the 1940s.

Bezzant was born in Wellington and educated at Wellington College. He served in the Royal New Zealand Air Force during World War II. 

He made his first-class debut for the Royal New Zealand Air Force cricket team in April 1943, scoring 63 and 78 out of team totals of 128 and 278. He played three first-class friendly matches in 1943–44, including two for Wellington, but did not reach 50 in any of them.

References

External links 

1916 births
2002 deaths
New Zealand cricketers
Wellington cricketers
People educated at Wellington College (New Zealand)
Royal New Zealand Air Force cricketers
New Zealand military personnel of World War II
New Zealand Services cricketers
Cricketers from Wellington City